Pseudomonas segitis is a Gram-negative, aerobic soil bacterium found in Korea. The type strain is IMSNU 14101.

References

Pseudomonadales
Bacteria described in 2006